Baraeomimus is a genus of beetles in the family Cerambycidae, containing a single species, Baraeomimus usambaricus. It was described by Breuning in 1973. The beetle is native to Tanzania.

References

Desmiphorini
Beetles described in 1973
Monotypic Cerambycidae genera